The Seoul Shinmun (translating to The Seoul Newspaper) is the oldest daily newspaper in South Korea with more than a century of publication. Its original name was Daehan Maeil Sinbo (The Korea Daily News), which was started on 18 July 1904, and was renamed Daily News (Maeil Sinbo) in August 1910. The publication's current name was adopted in November 1945. 

Circulation is an estimated 780,000 issues a day.

The Seoul Shinmun was also the nation's only daily until 1920, when The Dong-a Ilbo debuted.

See also
List of newspapers in South Korea
Media in South Korea
Contemporary culture of South Korea

External links
Seoul Shinmun official website 

Publications established in 1904
Newspapers established in 1910
Newspapers established in 1945
Newspapers published in Seoul
Newspaper companies of South Korea